Milici is a village in the Province of Messina of Sicily, Italy.

Geography
As of 31 December 2007, it had a population of 600.

The village is in the Municipality of Rodì Milici, and borders the following municipalities: Antillo, Castroreale, Fondachelli-Fantina, Mazzarrà Sant'Andrea, Novara di Sicilia, Terme Vigliatore.
As to its name, it has been suggested to be derived from the Akkadian mil- , a flooding river, and –ki, a locality suffix (G. Tripodi. Some archaic toponyms of Middle Eastern origin in Western Europe. Complessità 2013,  VIII p. 283). The village is indeed located close to a  river of such a type,  nearby an area with Bronze Age ruins.

External links
 A view from  Mt. Nicoletta (above Milici).

Metropolitan City of Messina